The playoff results from the Erste Bank Eishockey Liga era of the Austrian Hockey League. The Austrian Hockey League was renamed the Erste Bank Eishockey Liga in 2003. These are the playoff records from that era.
Teams compete for the Karl Nedved Trophy, named after the longtime president of the Klagenfurt team.

2016–17 season playoffs

2015–16 season playoffs

2014–15 season playoffs

2013–14 season playoffs

2012–13 season playoffs

2011–12 season playoffs

2010–11 season playoffs

2009–10 season playoffs

2008–09 season playoffs

2007–08 season playoffs

2006–07 season playoffs

2005–06 season playoffs

2004–05 season playoffs

2003–04 season playoffs

References

playoffs